There have been four baronetcies created for persons with the surname Crofton, two in the Baronetage of Ireland and two in the Baronetage of the United Kingdom. As of 2014 three creations are extant.

The Crofton Baronetcy, of The Mote in County Roscommon, was created in the Baronetage of Ireland on 1 July 1661 for Edward Crofton, as a reward for his record of loyalty to King Charles II during the English Civil War. He sat in the Irish House of Commons as member for Lanesborough, and served as High Sheriff of Roscommon and High Sheriff of Leitrim. He was succeeded in the title by his son Edward, the second Baronet, who sat in the Irish House of Commons as member first for Boyle, and subsequently for Roscommon, and was a member of the Privy Council of Ireland in 1713–14. He was a prominent opponent of King James II of England, and was attainted by the Patriot Parliament of 1689, but recovered his estates the following year. His eldest son, the third baronet, also represented Roscommon in the House of Commons. The title became extinct on the death of the fifth Baronet in 1780.

The Crofton Baronetcy, of The Mote in the County of Roscommon, was created in the Baronetage of Ireland on 12 June 1758 for Marcus Lowther-Crofton. He was the husband of Catherine, daughter of the third Baronet of the 1661 creation and had earlier assumed the surname of Crofton. For more information on this creation, see the Baron Crofton.

The Crofton Baronetcy, of Mohill in the County of Leitrim, was created in the Baronetage of the United Kingdom on 10 August 1801 for Morgan Crofton. The sixth Baronet was a Lieutenant-Colonel in the 2nd Life Guards and fought in the Second Boer War, where he was severely wounded at the Relief of Ladysmith, and in the two world wars. His diaries from the First World War are published as Massacre of the Innocents: The Crofton Diaries, Ypres 1914–1915 (2004). Another member of the family, James Crofton, grandson of Morgan Crofton, third son of the first Baronet, was a Lieutenant-General in the Army.

The Crofton Baronetcy, of Longford House in the County of Sligo, was created in the Baronetage of the United Kingdom on 18 August 1838 for James Crofton. He was descended from Thomas Crofton, uncle of the first Baronet of the 1661 creation.

Crofton baronets, of The Mote (1661)
Sir Edward Crofton, 1st Baronet (1624–1675)
Sir Edward Crofton, 2nd Baronet (c. 1662–1729)
Sir Edward Crofton, 3rd Baronet (1687–1739)
Sir Edward Crofton, 4th Baronet (1713–1745)
Sir Oliver Crofton, 5th Baronet (1710–1780)

Crofton baronets, of The Mote (1758)
see the Baron Crofton

Crofton baronets, of Mohill (1801)

Sir Morgan Crofton, 1st Baronet (1733–1802)
Sir Hugh Crofton, 2nd Baronet (1763–1834)
Sir Morgan George Crofton, 3rd Baronet (1788–1867)
Sir Morgan George Crofton, 4th Baronet (1850–1900)
Sir Hugh Denis Crofton, 5th Baronet (1878–1902)
Sir Morgan George Crofton, 6th Baronet (1879–1958) 
Sir Patrick Simon Crofton, 7th Baronet (1936–1987)
Sir (Hugh) Denis Crofton, 8th Baronet (1937–2016)
Sir Edward Morgan Crofton, 9th Baronet (b.1945)

The heir apparent is the present holder's son Henry Morgan Crofton (born 1979).

Crofton baronets, of Longford House (1838)

Sir James Crofton, 1st Baronet (1776–1849)
Sir Malby Crofton, 2nd Baronet (1797–1872)
Sir Malby Crofton, 3rd Baronet (1857–1926)
Sir (Malby Richard) Henry Crofton, 4th Baronet (1881–1962)
Sir Malby Sturges Crofton, 5th Baronet (1923–2002)
Sir Henry Edward Melville Crofton, 6th Baronet (1931–2003)
Sir Julian Malby Crofton, 7th Baronet (1958–2018)
Sir William Robert Malby Crofton, 8th Baronet (born 1996)

Sir Julian Malby Crofton also has two other children, Harriet Crofton and Edward James Crofton (b. 29 October 1998).

See also
Baron Crofton
Crofton family

References

Kidd, Charles, Williamson, David (editors). Debrett's Peerage and Baronetage (1990 edition). New York: St Martin's Press, 1990,

External links
Photograph of Sir Morgan Crofton, 6th Baronet, of Mohill, and his wife Lady Crofton

Baronetcies in the Baronetage of Ireland
Baronetcies in the Baronetage of the United Kingdom
Extinct baronetcies in the Baronetage of Ireland
1661 establishments in Ireland
1801 establishments in the United Kingdom